Dark Was the Night is the twentieth compilation release benefiting the Red Hot Organization, an international charity dedicated to raising funds and awareness for HIV and AIDS. Featuring exclusive recordings by a number of independent artists and production by Aaron and Bryce Dessner of The National, the compilation was released on 16 February 2009 (UK) and 17 February (US) as a double CD, three vinyl LPs, and as a digital download. John Carlin, the founder of the Red Hot Organization, was the executive producer for the album. The title is derived from the Blind Willie Johnson song "Dark Was the Night, Cold Was the Ground", which is covered on this collection by the Kronos Quartet.

John Carlin and Aaron Dessner approached Martin Mills and Richard Russell of Beggars Group with the idea for the album. Their selection of artists to include was an attempt to "capture this musical renaissance, which may not have the cultural impact of grunge or punk, but is equally significant from a cultural and creative standpoint...these artists are not fringe or marginal."  The American folk roots of the compilation are acknowledged in the title and exemplified by tracks such as the cover of Bob Dylan's "I Was Young When I Left Home". Production of the album was focused on supporting the Red Hot Organization, as Dessner says "a lot of the artists wouldn't take the money...Beggars agreed to be really transparent about how it's done, so as much money flows to the charity side as possible."

As of May 2012, Dark Was the Night has raised over $1.6 million, a sum that represents all the profits from worldwide sales. John Carlin acknowledged the reason for the album's success, saying "Dark Was the Night encapsulated the spirit and creativity of a new generation of musicians whose work struck a chord and got people to actually purchase the album and raise hundreds of thousands of dollars to fight AIDS."

On May 3, 2009 4AD and Red Hot produced Dark Was the Night — Live, a concert commemorating the newest Red Hot album. The show took place at Radio City Music Hall and featured several of the artists that contributed to the compilation including Dave Sitek, Dirty Projectors, Feist, My Brightest Diamond, The National, Sharon Jones & The Dap-Kings plus more.

Track listing

CD and digital track listing

 "Play the Game" (Queen) by Beach House was additionally released as an iTunes only bonus track as the fifteenth track on "That Disc".
 A misprint in the track listing on the CD case lists Cat Power's "Amazing Grace" as track 10, and Stuart Murdoch's "Another Saturday" as track 12. The booklet has the correct order.

Vinyl track listing

Side one
 "Knotty Pine" – Dirty Projectors and David Byrne
 "Cello Song" – The Books and José González
 "Train Song" – Feist and Ben Gibbard
 "Brackett, WI" – Bon Iver
 "Deep Blue Sea" – Grizzly Bear

Side two
 "So Far Around the Bend" – The National
 "Tightrope" – Yeasayer
 "Feeling Good" – My Brightest Diamond
 "Dark Was the Night" – Kronos Quartet
 "I Was Young When I Left Home" – Antony + Bryce Dessner
 "Big Red Machine" – Justin Vernon and Aaron Dessner

Side three
 "Well-Alright" – Spoon
 "Lenin" – Arcade Fire
 "Mimizan" – Beirut
 "El Caporal" – My Morning Jacket
 "Inspiration Information" – Sharon Jones and the Dap-Kings
 "With a Girl Like You" – Dave Sitek

Side four
 "You Are the Blood" – Sufjan Stevens
 "Blood Pt. 2" – Buck 65 Remix (featuring Sufjan Stevens and Serengeti)
 "Hey, Snow White" – The New Pornographers
 "Gentle Hour" – Yo La Tengo
 "Die" – Iron and Wine

Side five
 "Service Bell" – Grizzly Bear and Feist
 "Sleepless" – The Decemberists
 "Happiness" – Riceboy Sleeps
 "Amazing Grace" – Cat Power and Dirt Delta Blues

Side six
 "Another Saturday" – Stuart Murdoch
 "The Giant of Illinois" – Andrew Bird
 "Lua" – Conor Oberst and Gillian Welch
 "When the Road Runs Out" – Blonde Redhead and Devastations
 "Love vs. Porn" – Kevin Drew

Singles
Additionally, a double A-side 7" single was released to promote the compilation:
 Dark Was the Night: Songs from the Upcoming Red Hot Compilation
 2 February 2009; 4AD AD 2834
 "Knotty Pine" – Dirty Projectors and David Byrne – 2:23
 "So Far Around the Bend" – The National – 3:43

References

External links
 Official site

Red Hot Organization albums
2009 compilation albums
4AD compilation albums
Charity albums
Albums produced by Aaron Dessner